Martin Hamilton House, also known as the Hamilton House Museum, is a historic home located at Summersville, Nicholas County, West Virginia.  It was built in 1893, and is a simple one-story, frame dwelling with clapboard siding and a corrugated metal roof.  An eight-foot addition was built in 1936. It was donated to the Nicholas County Historical and Genealogical Society in 1985, and is used as a museum and genealogical library.

It was listed on the National Register of Historic Places in 1999.

References

History museums in West Virginia
Houses on the National Register of Historic Places in West Virginia
Houses completed in 1893
Houses in Nicholas County, West Virginia
National Register of Historic Places in Nicholas County, West Virginia